WAMR-FM (107.5 MHz) is a commercial radio station in Miami, Florida. It airs a Spanish AC and tropical radio format aimed at Spanish-speaking adults.  The station is owned by Univision Radio with the license held by Univision Radio Illinois, Inc. The station also broadcasts on HD radio.

The transmitter is off NW 207th Street in Miami.  The call sign WAMR refers to the Spanish word amor, which means "love".

History
On June 7, 1974, the station first signed on as WIGL.  It was the FM sister station to AM 1260 WWOK (now WSUA), both owned by the Mission East Company, and airing a country music format.  In 1979, the station was acquired by Susquehanna Radio, which switched it to a Spanish-language Top 40/Dance format as WQBA-FM ("Super Q"), sister to WQBA 1140 AM.  By the late 1980s, the station had shifted to a Spanish Adult Contemporary sound.

In 1995, the call letters were changed to WAMR-FM and the station began calling itself "Amor."  At this point, the format was mostly romantic ballads by artists such as Julio Iglesias and Gloria Estefan.  A similar format was launched one dial position away, on 106.7 WRMA (now WXDJ) whose call letters stood for "Romantica."  Both stations enjoyed much success with adult Spanish-speaking listeners in Miami.

In 2003, WAMR-FM was bought by Univision Radio.  The company's television headquarters was already based in Miami and the acquisition of several Spanish-language Miami radio stations helped the company move into radio ownership.  By this time, the station had moved away from its soft ballad sound, playing more uptempo international and tropical hits but still aimed at an adult audience.  WAMR-FM remains one of the Miami radio market's top rated stations.

References

External links

Hispanic and Latino American culture in Miami
AMR-FM
AMR-FM
Univision Radio Network stations
1974 establishments in Florida
Radio stations established in 1974